Inga Borodich or Inha Hyenadzyewna Borodich (born 30 May 1979) is a Belarusian freestyle swimmer. She competed in three events at the 1996 Summer Olympics.

References

External links
 

1979 births
Living people
Belarusian female freestyle swimmers
Olympic swimmers of Belarus
Swimmers at the 1996 Summer Olympics
Place of birth missing (living people)
People from Kobryn
Sportspeople from Brest Region